Goh Sze Fei (born 18 August 1997) is a Malaysian badminton player. He won the 2022 German Open in the men's doubles event partnered with Nur Izzuddin, their first BWF World Tour title.

Early life 
Goh finished his primary school in SJK(C) Chung Hua Tampin, Negeri Sembilan. During his secondary school period, which was in Sekolah Mengengah Kebangsaan Tunku Besar at Tampin, he managed to get recruited into Badminton Association of Malaysia during his secondary school period to be trained as a national player. 

Goh comes from a typical Malaysia Chinese family based in Tampin, Negeri Sembilan. There are 4 siblings in his family and he is the youngest among the siblings. All his siblings are very enthusiastic in badminton sports and Goh's eldest, Goh Sze Boon and second elder brother, Goh Sze Onn used to be Malaysian national players as well. Goh's first badminton coach was Goh Sai Chong who guided and coached Sze Fei since he was at his young age.

Achievements

Asian Championships 
Men's doubles

BWF World Tour (1 title, 1 runner-up)
The BWF World Tour, which was announced on 19 March 2017 and implemented in 2018, is a series of elite badminton tournaments sanctioned by the Badminton World Federation (BWF). The BWF World Tours are divided into levels of World Tour Finals, Super 1000, Super 750, Super 500, Super 300, and the BWF Tour Super 100.

Men's doubles

BWF Grand Prix (1 runner-up) 
The BWF Grand Prix had two levels, the Grand Prix and Grand Prix Gold. It was a series of badminton tournaments sanctioned by the Badminton World Federation (BWF) and played between 2007 and 2017.

Men's doubles

  BWF Grand Prix Gold tournament
  BWF Grand Prix tournament

BWF International Challenge/Series (3 titles, 5 runners-up) 
Men's doubles

  BWF International Challenge tournament
  BWF International Series tournament
  BWF Future Series tournament

References

External links 
 

1997 births
Living people
People from Malacca
Malaysian sportspeople of Chinese descent
Malaysian male badminton players
Competitors at the 2017 Southeast Asian Games
Southeast Asian Games silver medalists for Malaysia
Southeast Asian Games medalists in badminton
21st-century Malaysian people